Eupithecia omnigera is a moth in the family Geometridae first described by András Mátyás Vojnits in 1982. It is found in the Pamir, Altai and Vantshu regions of central Asia.

The length of the forewings in males ranges between 17.5–26 mm and in females between 20–27 mm. There are two generations per year with adults on wing from April to June and again in July.

References

Moths described in 1982
omnigera
Moths of Asia